The Kidderminster & District League is an English amateur league, affiliated to the Worcestershire County F.A for teams based near Kidderminster, which therefore draws teams from Worcestershire and South Staffordshire.  The league now operates Sunday league football and a women's division.  Prior to 2014 it was known as Kidderminster & District Saturday League and operated Saturday divisions.

Successful teams from this league could apply for promotion to the West Midlands (Regional) League, which placed this league's top division at the thirteenth level of the English football league system.  Teams to have progressed to the higher level include Ludlow Town (1979), Bandon (1995), Bewdley Town (1999), Brintons Athletic (2000), Ounsdale (2000), and Tenbury United (2003).

Champions
The champions of the league's various divisions have been as follows:

References

 
Football in Worcestershire
Football leagues in England
Kidderminster